Jan van den Tempel (1 August 1877 – 27 June 1955) was a Dutch politician of the defunct Social Democratic Workers' Party (SDAP) now merged into the Labour Party (PvdA).

Decorations

References

External links

Official
  Dr. J. (Jan) van den Tempel Parlement & Politiek

1877 births
1955 deaths
Commanders of the Order of Orange-Nassau
Dutch financial writers
Dutch expatriates in Belgium
Dutch expatriates in France
Dutch nonprofit directors
Dutch magazine editors
Dutch trade union leaders
Dutch people of World War II
Dutch political writers
Erasmus University Rotterdam alumni
Knights of the Order of the Netherlands Lion
Members of the House of Representatives (Netherlands)
Members of the Provincial Council of North Holland
Ministers of Agriculture of the Netherlands
Ministers of Economic Affairs of the Netherlands
Ministers of Social Affairs of the Netherlands
Municipal councillors of Amsterdam
People from Moerdijk
Social Democratic Workers' Party (Netherlands) politicians
Writers about activism and social change
20th-century Dutch economists
20th-century Dutch male writers
20th-century Dutch politicians